Hildreth may refer to:

Places
Hildreth, California
Hildreth, Nebraska
Hildreth Cemetery in Lowell, Massachusetts

Other uses
Hildreth (name)